The Capitol Broadcasting Company, Inc. (CBC) is an American media company based in Raleigh, North Carolina. Capitol owns three television stations and nine radio stations in the Raleigh–Durham and Wilmington areas of North Carolina and the Durham Bulls minor league baseball team. It is one of the few family-owned broadcasting companies left in the country, having been owned by four generations of the Fletcher-Goodmon family.

History

A.J. Fletcher founded the Capitol Broadcasting Company in 1937, when he founded Raleigh radio station WRAL (1240 AM, now WPJL). WRAL radio began transmission two years later in 1939, using a 250-watt transmitter, becoming Raleigh's second radio station (after WPTF). In 1942, Capitol created the Tobacco Radio Network, a farm news radio service that was discontinued in 2002. On September 6, 1946, Capitol Broadcasting received a license with the Federal Communications Commission for WCOY-FM (whose callsign was later changed to WRAL-FM), operating from a 250,000-watt transmitter. In 1960, CBC founded the North Carolina News Network, a statewide radio network that now provides news, weather and sports content to about 80 radio stations. This property was sold to Curtis Media Group in 2009.

On December 15, 1956, Capitol Broadcasting's flagship television station WRAL-TV went on the air in Raleigh. In 1979, WRAL-TV became the first television station in the state of North Carolina to have a dedicated helicopter for newsgathering. In 1987, Capitol acquired independent station WJZY-TV in Charlotte. The following year, Capitol also acquired another independent station, WTTV and its satellite station, WTTK, in the Indianapolis area. WTTV and WTTK were sold in 1991 to River City Broadcasting. In 1996, WRAL-TV was granted the first experimental high definition digital television license in the United States by the Federal Communications Commission. On October 13, 2000, WRAL became the first television station in the world to broadcast a news program entirely in high-definition; the station would begin broadcasting all of its local newscasts in high-definition in January 2001. In 2001, Capitol purchased WFVT (now WMYT-TV) in Charlotte, creating the market's second television duopoly. On October 14, 2005, Capitol Broadcasting signed on WCMC-FM on 99.9 MHz in Raleigh with a country music format, "Genuine Country".

In July 2008, Capitol Broadcasting acquired five radio stations in Wilmington from NextMedia Group for $12 million. On April 14, 2009, Capitol Broadcasting and the City of Raleigh partnered to introduce the first mobile digital television in a public transit bus. On January 28, 2013, Fox Television Stations announced that it had entered into an agreement to purchase WJZY and WMYT from Capitol for $18 million; the deal was completed on April 17.

Major assets
Notes:
1) Two boldface asterisks appearing following a station's call letters (**) indicate a station that was built and signed-on by Capitol Broadcasting Company;

Television stations

Radio stations
Note: Stations operated within the Wilmington radio station cluster are operated under the name Sunrise Broadcasting;

Sports
 Durham Bulls – Triple-A minor league baseball team in the International League
 Holly Springs Salamanders - collegiate summer baseball team in the Coastal Plain League
 Wolfpack Sports Properties - joint venture with Learfield IMG College covering NC State Wolfpack sports
 Coastal Plain League

Investments
 TitanTV Media

Former assets

Television stations

Radio
 North Carolina News Network (now owned by Curtis Media Group)
 WILT - Wilmington, NC (now owned by Bible Broadcasting Network with the call sign WYHW)
 WWMX - Baltimore, MD (now owned by Audacy)
 WOCT-FM - Baltimore, MD (now owned by iHeartMedia with the call sign WZFT)
 WRNL - Richmond, VA (now owned by Audacy)
 WRXL - Richmond, VA (now owned by Audacy)
 WSTF - Cocoa Beach, FL (now owned by iHeartMedia with the call sign WJRR)

References

External links
 

 
Mass media in North Carolina
Broadcasting companies of the United States
Television broadcasting companies of the United States
Companies based in Raleigh, North Carolina
Entertainment companies established in 1937
Mass media companies established in 1937
Radio broadcasting companies of the United States